Clinical Opiate Withdrawal Scale (COWS) is a method used by registered practitioners to measure the severity of a patient's opioid withdrawal symptoms. This method consists of a series of 11 topics each comprising 4 - 5 common symptoms experienced by a patient undergoing opioid withdrawal. In each topic a rank is given depending on what the patient responds to. Generally, 0 is considered to be no symptom shown and 4 or 5 is considered to be the most common and severe symptom shown. These results are then added up and a final diagnosis is made based on the value obtained. This test is crucial as it allows the practitioner to assess the physiological and psychological behaviours of the patient as well as the severity of each symptom during the duration of the examination. The results are grouped into 3 categories of mild, moderately severe and severe. Mild consists of 5 to 12 points, moderately severe consists of 13 to 24 points and anything above 36 points is severe and requires direct medical attention.

Scales measuring withdrawal symptoms examine the dependence of an individual on the opioids consumed before undertaking any sort of medical induction such as buprenorphine. Measuring opioid withdrawal symptoms was first introduced to clinics, hospitals and used as a source of evidence for researchers around the mid-1930s. Over time, the progression and development in health and medicine allowed the introduction of new and more advanced scales which tested for more signs and symptoms. The most recent scale that has been introduced is COWS.

This useful tool provides the opportunity for practitioners to ensure an effective and efficient treatment process and researchers the ability to unlock new developments within the area of study.

Types of opioids 

An opioid would be classified as any form of synthetic substance that will bind to the opioid receptors within the human brain. These receptors are located in the parts of the brain that generally monitor and maintain pain. There are many heavily regulated prescription medications and most of these are used as strong painkillers. The main types of opioids include morphine, oxycodone hydrochloride, fentanyl, naloxone, tapentadol, methadone and hydromorphone. These drugs or a combination of these drugs are generally sold under the following brand names;   

- Targin

- Palexia

- Endone

- Norspan

- Oxynorm

- Oxycontin

These analgesic drugs bind and acts on opioid receptors in both the gastrointestinal and central nervous system to alleviate moderate to severe pain. This sedating medication acts on receptors known as mu-receptors to reduce pain radiation across the body. These can come in the form of extended release medication or immediate release depending on the condition and type of medication being consumed.

Effect of opioid 

Opioids are commonly used for patients who are undergoing cancer treatment, chronic pain and postoperative pain. Although these drugs are suitable for treatment, in long term patients or a misuse of these drugs can increase the risk of toxicity, sleep apnea, abnormal decrease to pain tolerance. Excessive or prolonged opioid use can internally affect many organs which in turn can suppress immunity. One of the main functional systems of the body affected by opioid use is the endocrine function. If this system is affected much like the domino effect, many other bodily functions will be triggered. These functions include reduced sexual function as a result of libido reduction, infertility, mood disorders, respiratory depression, osteoporosis and possibly  osteopenia. If these functions are affected, the recovery process will be more difficult as it will require constant patient care through the use of more medications, tests and scans.

Application  

Clinical Opioid Withdrawal Scale more commonly known as COWS is a method used to measure opioid withdrawal symptoms for both inpatients and outpatients. This intricate scaling system allows the analysis of patient condition. Each question in this test provides the opportunity for the practitioner to identify the severity and the type of opioid withdrawal symptoms being experienced by the patient. As shown in table 1 below these are the examinable topics which are generally rated a number between 0 to 4 depending on the patient's current condition. In some COWS, a rating of 5 can also be given (shown in the table 1 below). The annotated table lists the signs and symptoms that are being monitored at score 0 and 4. However, it is important to consider that the numbers 1,2 and 3 are also awarded depending on the type and severity of signs and symptoms being experienced by the patient.

Table 1: COWS made simple

This table was summarised and annotated based on the scale provided in the Clinical Opiate Withdrawal Scale pdf from the National Institute on Drug Abuse – Advancing Addiction Science.

Post diagnosis 

After being diagnosed with opioid withdrawal syndrome through the use of the scale, immediate medical attention is required. One of the most common first line of treatments administered is Buprenorphine. There are 3 factors that need to be taken into consideration whilst treating the patient with this multi-use drug;

 Induction
 Stabilisation
 Maintenance

These 3 factors are crucial in ensuring full and safe patient recovery. This opioid agonist will decrease toxicity during overdose as it acts as an antagonist for the opioid receptors in the body which then inhibits the adverse effects of opioid use. This will then allow the patient to become stabilised which then allows the practitioner to maintain and monitor the patient's stable condition.

References 

Opioid epidemic
Withdrawal syndromes